Vallcarca i els Penitents is a neighbourhood in the northernmost part of Gràcia, a district of Barcelona. Locked between two hills, Putget and El Coll, it grew out of a few scattered settlements, namely L'Hostal de la Farigola, Can Falcó, Can Mas and Can Gomis.

The Parish Church, Virgen de Gracia y San José, popularly known as the “Josepets,” is the location of a Traditional Latin Mass, authorised by bishop Reig Casanova in 2021.

Transportation
Barcelona Metro stations Vallcarca and Penitents, both on L3.

See also 

 Urban planning of Barcelona

Gràcia
Neighbourhoods of Barcelona